David Kellner (1670 – 6 April 1748) was a German composer of the Baroque period and a contemporary of Bach.

Kellner was born in Liebertwolkwitz, near Leipzig. Apart from compositions for the lute, which are today highly regarded, he wrote on the theory of music and particularly on writing for equal temperament. His diagram of the circle of fifths is the earliest extant example of the modern layout with major keys and minor keys in two concentric circles, the major immediately outside its relative minor.

External links
 David Kellner - A biographical survey
 

1670 births
1748 deaths
18th-century classical composers
18th-century German composers
18th-century German male musicians
Composers for lute
German Baroque composers
German classical composers
German lutenists
German male classical composers
German music theorists